MacTutor may refer to:

The MacTutor History of Mathematics archive, a history of mathematics archive
MacTutor (magazine), a magazine on developing software for the Apple Macintosh computer